Glen Campbell Live may refer to:

 Glen Campbell Live (1969 album), a 1969 album by Glen Campbell
 Glen Campbell Live (1981 album), a 1981 album by Glen Campbell, released only in the UK

See also
 Glen Campbell Live! His Greatest Hits, a 1994 album by Glen Campbell